Silvia Magri (born 17 October 2000) is an Italian professional racing cyclist, who currently rides for UCI Women's Continental Team .

Major results
2022 
 5th Trofeo Oro in Euro–Women's Bike Race

References

External links
 

2000 births
Living people
Italian female cyclists
People from Gallarate
Cyclists from the Province of Varese